Last Farewell may refer to:
"Last Farewell", a song by the American folk band The New Christy Minstrels, from their 1963 album Ramblin
"Last Farewell", a song by the British psychedelic rock band Kula Shaker, from their 1999 album Peasants, Pigs & Astronauts
"Last Farewell", a song by the South Korean pop band Big Bang, from their 2007 extended play Hot Issue
"The Last Farewell", a hit song by the British-Kenyan folk singer Roger Whittaker, from multiple album releases
Little House: The Last Farewell, a 1984 made-for-TV movie that aired after the original run of the drama series Little House on the Prairie
"Mi último adiós" (Spanish for "My last farewell"), an 1896 poem by the Filipino nationalist Jose Rizal